In mathematics, a Vitali set is an elementary example of a set of real numbers that is not Lebesgue measurable, found by Giuseppe Vitali in 1905. The Vitali theorem is the existence theorem that there are such sets. There are uncountably many Vitali sets, and their existence depends on the axiom of choice. In 1970, Robert Solovay constructed a model of Zermelo–Fraenkel set theory without the axiom of choice where all sets of real numbers are Lebesgue measurable, assuming the existence of an inaccessible cardinal (see Solovay model).

Measurable sets 
Certain sets have a definite 'length' or 'mass'. For instance, the interval [0, 1] is deemed to have length 1; more generally, an interval [a, b], a ≤ b, is deemed to have length b − a. If we think of such intervals as metal rods with uniform density, they likewise have well-defined masses. The set [0, 1] ∪ [2, 3] is composed of two intervals of length one, so we take its total length to be 2. In terms of mass, we have two rods of mass 1, so the total mass is 2.

There is a natural question here: if E is an arbitrary subset of the real line, does it have a 'mass' or 'total length'? As an example, we might ask what is the mass of the set of rational numbers, given that the mass of the interval [0, 1] is 1. The rationals are dense in the reals, so any value between and including 0 and 1 may appear reasonable.

However the closest generalization to mass is sigma additivity, which gives rise to the Lebesgue measure. It assigns a measure of b − a to the interval [a, b], but will assign a measure of 0 to the set of rational numbers because it is countable. Any set which has a well-defined Lebesgue measure is said to be "measurable", but the construction of the Lebesgue measure (for instance using Carathéodory's extension theorem) does not make it obvious whether non-measurable sets exist. The answer to that question involves the axiom of choice.

Construction and proof 
A Vitali set is a subset  of the interval  of real numbers such that, for each real number , there is exactly one number  such that  is a rational number. Vitali sets exist because the rational numbers  form a normal subgroup of the real numbers  under addition, and this allows the construction of the additive quotient group  of these two groups which is the group formed by the cosets of the rational numbers as a subgroup of the real numbers under addition. A set formed this way is called a Vitali set.

Non-measurability

A Vitali set is non-measurable. To show this, we assume that  is measurable and we derive a contradiction.
. 

Apply the Lebesgue measure to these inclusions using sigma additivity:

Because the Lebesgue measure is translation invariant,  and therefore

But this is impossible. Summing infinitely many copies of the constant  yields either zero or infinity, according to whether the constant is zero or positive.

See also

References

Bibliography
 
 

Sets of real numbers
Measure theory
Articles containing proofs
Axiom of choice